The Sheriff of Roxburgh was historically the royal official responsible for enforcing law and order in that area of Scotland.  Prior to 1748 most sheriffdoms were held on a hereditary basis. From that date, following the Jacobite uprising of 1745, the hereditary sheriffs were replaced by salaried sheriff-deputes, qualified advocates who were members of the Scottish Bar.

The position of Sheriff of Roxburgh and Selkirk was created in 1868 following a merger of the position  with that of Sheriff of Selkirk.

The combined sheriffdom was further enlarged in 1872 by its merger with part of the sheriffdom of Haddington and Berwick to create the sheriffdom of Roxburgh, Berwick and Selkirk. That resulting sheriffdom was dissolved in turn in 1975 with the creation of the current sheriffdom of Lothian and Borders.

Sheriffs of Roxburgh
Gospatric, c.1120 (first sheriff)
Walter Corbet, 1199
Bernard de Hauben, 1202
Adam of Baggot, 1235
Nicholas de Soules (died 1264), 1237, 1246
Hugh de Abernethy, 1264-1266
Thomas Cauer, 1266
Thomas de Randuph, 1266
Hugh de Peresby, 1285
William de Sules, 1289
Walter Tonk, 1295
Ingram de Umfraville, 1299
Robert Hastang, 1305
Robert de Mauleye, 1306
Robert de Maul, 1325
Henry de Baliol, 1328
Geoffrey de Moubray
Alexander Ramsay, 1342
William de Feltoun, -1343
William Douglas, Lord of Liddesdale
John de Coupland, 1347
William Kareswell
Henry de Percy, 3rd Baron Percy, 1355
Richard Tempest, 1359
Henry Kerr, 1359
Alan de Strother, 1364
Lawrence of Govan, 1373
Thomas de Percy, 1376
Thomas Umfraville
Henry Percy (Hotspur)
Malcolm Drummond, c.1389
William Stewart of Jedforest, 1396
George Douglas, 1st Earl of Angus, 1397
George of Angus, 1398
David Fleming of Biggar, 1402-1405 (killed by Douglases)
Archibald Douglas
Archibald Douglas of Cavers, 1412
William Douglas of Cavers
Archibald Douglas of Cavers, 1464
William Douglas of Cavers and Cluny, 1470
James Douglas, 1470 - Deputy
Archibald Douglas, 5th Earl of Angus, 1488
held by Douglas family until 1747

Sheriffs-Depute
1748-1753: Gilbert Eliot
1753: William Scott of Woll 
1754-1769: Walter Pringle 
1769-: Patrick Murray of Cherrytrees 
1780–1807: William Oliver of Dinlabyre   
1807–>1861: William Oliver Rutherfurd of Edgerston

Sheriffs of Roxburgh and Selkirk (1868)

Sheriffs of Roxburgh, Berwick and Selkirk (1872)
 John Cheyne, 1885-1886  (Sheriff of Ross, Cromarty and Sutherland, 1886–89) 
 Andrew Jameson, 1886–1890
 David Boyle Hope, 29 Nov 1890-1896 
 Richard Vary Campbell, 15 Oct 1896–1901
 Edward Theodore Salvesen, 1901–1905 
 John Chisholm, 1905–  
 William Ross MacLean, QC, –1955  (Renfrew and Argyll, 1955–1960)
 John Jeffrey Cunningham, QC, 1955–1956 
 Harald Robert Leslie, QC, 1956–1961 (Sheriff of Caithness, 1961–65)
 George Gordon Stott, QC, 1961–64   
 Robert Smith Johnston, 1964–1970 
 David Brand, Lord Brand, 1970
 Henry Keith, Baron Keith of Kinkel, QC, 1970–1971 
 Ronald Alastair Bennett, QC, 1971–  
 John Oswald Mair Hunter, Lord Hunter QC 1972-1975
 Sheriffdom dissolved in 1975 and replaced by the sheriffdom of Lothian and Borders.

See also
 Historical development of Scottish sheriffdoms

References

sheriff